Hayley Smith may refer to:

Hayley Smith (American Dad!), a character in the American animated sitcom American Dad!
Hayley Smith (artist) (born 1965), American artist
Hayley Smith (Home and Away), a character in the Australian soap opera Home and Away

See also 
Haley Smith (born 1993), Canadian cyclist